The Alton Gas & Electric Power House is a former hydroelectric power plant at 700 W. Broadway in Alton, Illinois. Built in 1913–14, the plant was a substation for the hydroelectric power system which had recently been built in Keokuk, Iowa. Alton had gotten its electricity from coal power until this point, and the hydroelectric plant helped lower energy costs in the city. The plant went online in 1915 and served as the city's primary power plant until 1928, when a series of mergers and reorganizations resulted in the Union Electric Company, which had also bought the Keokuk hydroelectric plant, purchasing the plant from Alton Gas & Electric. After 1928, the station only served as an emergency backup for Union Electric's other substations, and it closed for good in 1937. The building has since been used for machining operations and briefly served as an automobile dealership; it is currently owned by the Abbott Machine Company.

The building was added to the National Register of Historic Places on August 28, 2019.

References

National Register of Historic Places in Madison County, Illinois
Industrial buildings and structures on the National Register of Historic Places in Illinois
Energy infrastructure on the National Register of Historic Places
Industrial buildings completed in 1914
Alton, Illinois
Hydroelectric power plants in Illinois
Former hydroelectric power plants in the United States
Former power stations in Illinois